Kosswig's smooth newt (Lissotriton kosswigi) is a newt species found in northwestern Anatolia, east of the Bosphorus.

Günther Erich Freytag described the species in 1955 as Triturus vulgaris kosswigii, a subspecies of the smooth newt (now Lissotriton vulgaris). After genetic data had suggested the smooth newt was a complex of distinct lineages, Dubois and Raffaëlli, in 2009, recognised several subspecies, including Kosswig's smooth newt, as distinct species. This was followed by subsequent authors. Molecular phylogenetics suggested that the closest relative of Kosswig's smooth newt is the Greek smooth newt (Lissotriton graecus) from the Balkans.

The species differs from other species in the smooth newt species complex mainly in the male secondary characters during breeding season. The male dorsal crest is less than 1 mm high, but high at the tail base, has smooth edges, and ends in a long filament. The well-developed dorso-lateral folds give the body a square shape. The toe flaps are well developed.

Paedomorphic adults have been reported for Kosswig's smooth newt.

The species's conservation status has not yet been evaluated separately from the smooth newt by the IUCN. Since its range is much smaller than that of the smooth newt species complex as a whole, it is likely to be more vulnerable than previously estimated.

References

Lissotriton
Amphibians of Turkey
Endemic fauna of Turkey
Amphibians described in 1955